Armstrong (2016 Population 1,166) is a township in the Timiskaming District of Ontario.  The only population centre in the township is the community of Earlton.

The township is named after Samuel Armstrong, an Independent member of the Legislative Assembly of Ontario for Parry Sound from 1886 to 1890.

History
Earlton began to be settled in 1900 as a lumber community by pioneers mostly from York County, soon followed by French-speaking farmers who cultivated the flat prairie-like land of the surrounding Great Clay Belt. In 1904, its post office was opened. The postmaster, Edward Albert Brasher, named the community after his son Earl.

In 1921, Armstrong Township was incorporated.

Demographics 

Mother tongue:
 English as first language: 37.6%
 French as first language: 57.7%
 English and French as first language: 1.7%
 Other as first language: 2.6%

Economy

Major employers:

 Liquor Control Board of Ontario (LCBO)
 Desjardins Group
 Earlton Timber Mart

The community is renowned for its dairy and cash crop farms.

Transportation

Earlton (Timiskaming Regional) Airport is a regional airport located in Earlton, which opened in 1937 as an emergency landing area for Trans-Canada Air Lines. The airport today serves private light aircraft.  It was served by NorOntair from 1973 to 1996, and by the Air Defense Command in the 1950s.

Ontario Highway 11 is the major road connecting the community with other areas in Timiskaming and beyond. The retail strip is located along 10th Street North.

See also
 List of municipalities in Ontario
List of townships in Ontario
List of francophone communities in Ontario
Northern District School Area Board

References

External links

Municipalities in Timiskaming District
Single-tier municipalities in Ontario
Township municipalities in Ontario